Leptodeuterocopus tungurahue is a moth of the family Pterophoridae that is known from Ecuador.

Adults are on wing in September.

External links

Deuterocopinae
Moths described in 2006
Endemic fauna of Ecuador
Moths of South America